Utricularia appendiculata is a medium-sized, probably perennial, terrestrial carnivorous plant that belongs to the genus Utricularia and is the only member of Utricularia sect. Oliveria. U. appendiculata is endemic to Africa, where it can be found in Burundi, Cameroon, the Central African Republic, the Democratic Republic of the Congo, Gabon, Madagascar, Malawi, Mozambique, Tanzania, Uganda, and Zimbabwe. It flowers mostly in the wet season. It was originally published and described by Eileen Adelaide Bruce in 1933 and was placed in its own section, Oliveria, in 1986 by Peter Taylor.

See also 
 List of Utricularia species

References 

Carnivorous plants of Africa
Flora of Burundi
Flora of Cameroon
Flora of Gabon
Flora of Madagascar
Flora of Malawi
Flora of Mozambique
Flora of Tanzania
Flora of the Central African Republic
Flora of the Democratic Republic of the Congo
Flora of Uganda
Flora of Zimbabwe
appendiculata